Deepwater is a parish and small town 40 kilometres north of Glen Innes on the Northern Tablelands, New South Wales, Australia. At the 2006 census, Deepwater had a population of 307, with 489 people in the area.

Deepwater is located on the New England Highway and the Main North railway line (now closed). The village is on the northern bank of the Deepwater River which is a tributary of the Mole River.

History
The land where Deepwater was established is the territory of the Ngarabal people, who had occupied and carefully cultivated the country for thousands of years.  The Ngarabal name for Deepwater is Talgambuun, meaning dry country with many dead trees.

The Deepwater run was occupied in 1839 by William Cooins for the Windeyer brothers. In 1848 their run covered . The Windeyers had a close relationship with Edward Irby, who took up Bolivia Station further north.  There was strong Ngarabal resistance to Irby and Windeyer's incursions into Ngarabal country, including the killings of shepherds.  Irby's memoirs record that Windeyer joined him in pursuing and killing groups of Aboriginal people in retaliation for these acts.  The principal incident of this was on October 17, 1844, when Irby records that he and Windeyer "gave it to them severely" near Bolivia.  In addition, Commissioner for Crown Lands from the Clarence district, Oliver Fry and his assigned troopers, shot a group of Aboriginal people from further east into Ngarabul country at Deepwater, murdering five children, four women and seven men on April 15, 1845.

The railway station was opened in 1886. The Deepwater Public School was established in 1894. Some of the old buildings still in existence are the Deepwater Inn (currently being restored after a fire), Picture Theatre, Court House, Post Office, School of Arts, General Store and the Deepwater Public School.

Deepwater now has an Apex Park, Gem and Mineral store, Bakery, School, two Hotels, Post Office, CRT, Roadhouse, Antique Store and Foodworks Supermarket. An annual race meeting is held in January at the Deepwater Racecourse located behind the Deepwater Golf Course. It also has service organisations that include the Country Women's Association, Red Cross, Far West and Apex Club, SES and Rural Fire Service, pre-school and some other community organisations.

The district is an agricultural area with the main pursuits being wool, fat lamb and beef cattle production. In the past dairying, tin mining and timber were industries that contributed to the economy of the district.

Media
Deepwater is served by community radio station 2CBD FM. As well as broadcasting on two local FM frequencies 91.1 Deepwater and 105.9 Glen Innes, it has a live 24/7 feed via the internet. The station is the only radio station with studios in Glen Innes and is run by volunteers and presents local information and a diverse mix of music

Notable people
- Alex Cameron

References

Towns in New South Wales
Towns in New England (New South Wales)
Main North railway line, New South Wales